Mabalane District is a district of Gaza Province in south-western Mozambique. The administrative center of the district is Mabalane. The district is located at the center of the province, and borders with Chicualacuala District in the north, Chigubo District in the east, Guijá District in the southeast, Chókwè District in the south, and with Massingir District in the west. It has a population of 32,040 (2007).

Geography
The whole district belongs to the drainage basin of the Limpopo, and the Limpopo River flows through the district. Other big rivers in the district are the Chigombi River, the Sungutanu River, and the Chichakware River.

Banhine National Park, part of Great Limpopo Transfrontier Park, is shared between Chigubo, Chicualacuala, and Mabalane Districts. Limpopo National Park, also part of Great Limpopo Transfrontier Park, is shared between Massingir, Chicualacuala, and Mabalane Districts.

History
In 1957, the Portuguese colonial administration established a posto which got the name of Mabalane. The administrative center of the posto was at the railway station of Pinto Teixeira, and a jail was constructed next to the station. After the independence, Pinto Teixeira was renamed Mabalane.

Demographics
As of 2005, 44% of the population of the district was younger than 15 years. 14% of the population spoke Portuguese. The most common mothertongue among the population was Tsonga. 71% were analphabetic, mostly women.

Administrative divisions
The district is divided into three postos, Mabalane (three localities), Combomune (two localities), and Ntlavenhe (two localities).

Economy
Less than 1% of the households in the district have access to electricity.

Agriculture
In the district, there are 5,000 farms which have on average  of land. The main agricultural products are corn, cassava, cowpea, peanut, sweet potato, and rice.

Transportation
The Limpopo Railroad (Southern System) runs through the district.

References

Districts in Gaza Province